The 2015 MercedesCup was a men's tennis tournament played on grass courts. It was the 38th edition of the Stuttgart Open, and part of the ATP World Tour 250 series of the 2015 ATP World Tour. It was held at the Tennis Club Weissenhof in Stuttgart, Germany, from 8 June until 14 June 2015. This was the first year that the tournament was held on grass courts. First-seeded Rafael Nadal won the singles title.

Singles main-draw entrants

Seeds 

 1 Rankings are as of May 25, 2015

Other entrants 
The following players received wildcards into the singles main draw:
  Tommy Haas
  Maximilian Marterer
  Alexander Zverev

The following players received entry from the qualifying draw:
  Dustin Brown
  Peter Gojowczyk
  Mate Pavić
  Mischa Zverev

The following player received entry as a lucky loser:
  Matthias Bachinger

Withdrawals 
Before the tournament
  Julien Benneteau →replaced by Jan-Lennard Struff
  Radek Štěpánek →replaced by Matthias Bachinger
  Jiří Veselý →replaced by Sam Groth

Retirements 
  Sergiy Stakhovsky (back injury)

Doubles main-draw entrants

Seeds 

 Rankings are as of May 25, 2015

Other entrants 
The following pairs received wildcards into the doubles main draw:
  Andreas Beck /  Michael Berrer
  Philipp Petzschner /  Jan-Lennard Struff

The following pairs received entry as alternates:
  Borna Ćorić /  Ante Pavić
  Rameez Junaid /  Adil Shamasdin
  Lukáš Rosol /  Dominic Thiem

Withdrawals 
Before the tournament
  Mike Bryan (stomach pain)
  Sergiy Stakhovsky (back injury)
  Radek Štěpánek (back injury)

During the tournament
  Robert Farah (wrist injury)
  Rafael Nadal (fatigue)

Finals

Singles 

  Rafael Nadal defeated  Viktor Troicki, 7–6(7–3), 6–3

Doubles 

  Rohan Bopanna /  Florin Mergea defeated  Alexander Peya /  Bruno Soares, 5–7, 6–2, [10–7]

References

External links 
 
 ATP tournament profile

Stuttgart Open
Stuttgart Open
Stutt